Glamorganshire was a parliamentary constituency in Wales, returning two Members of Parliament (MPs) to the British House of Commons. The Redistribution of Seats Act 1885 divided it into five new constituencies: East Glamorganshire, South Glamorganshire, Mid Glamorganshire, Gower and Rhondda.

Boundaries 
This constituency comprised the whole of Glamorganshire.

History
For most of its history, the county constituency was represented by landowners from a small number of aristocratic families and this pattern continued until the nineteenth century. Following the Great Reform Act of 1832 a second county seat was created.

By the 1850s it had become virtually impossible for a Tory candidate to be elected as a county member since the industrial and urban vote could be rallied against him. This was proved in 1857 when Nash Vaughan Edwards-Vaughan failed in his attempt to dislodge one of the sitting members. Thereafter, until redistribution in 1885 led to the abolition of the constituency, the representation was shared by C.R.M. Talbot and Hussey Vivian. In line with Liberal party policy in two-member constituencies to run candidates from both wings of the party, the Whig aristocrat Talbot collaborated well with the more Radical Vivian.

Members of Parliament

MPs 1541–1832

MPs 1832–1885

Election results

Elections in the 1830s

Elections in the 1840s

Elections in the 1850s
Wyndham-Quin was appointed Steward of the Chiltern Hundreds, causing a by-election.

Elections in the 1860s

Elections in the 1870s

Elections in the 1880s

References

Sources

Books and Journals

Other
 A map of Glamorganshire in 1885, showing its new divisions.

Boundary Commission review Original Map from 1832 showing Glamorganshire constituency

Politics of Glamorgan
Historic parliamentary constituencies in South Wales
Constituencies of the Parliament of the United Kingdom established in 1536
Constituencies of the Parliament of the United Kingdom disestablished in 1885